Olivetti is an Italian surname. Notable people with the surname include:

 Adriano Olivetti (1901–1960), Italian engineer, politician and industrialist
 Albano Olivetti (born 1991), French tennis player
 Angelo Oliviero Olivetti (1874–1931), Italian lawyer, journalist, and political activist
 Ariel Olivetti (born 1967), Argentine comic book penciller
 Camillo Olivetti (1868–1943), Italian electrical engineer and founder of Olivetti & Co., SpA.
 Eva Olivetti (1924-2013), Uruguayan painter
 Luigi Olivetti (1856–1941), Italian painter and engraver
 Martino Olivetti (born 1985), former Italian footballer

See also 
 Olivotti (disambiguation)

Italian-language surnames